This is a list of people affiliated with Johns Hopkins University, an American university located in Baltimore, Maryland.

Notable alumni

Nobel laureates

Academia, science, medicine and technology

Athletics

Business

Government, public service, and public policy

Literature, arts and media

Notable faculty 

Herbert Baxter Adams – historian, coined phrase "political science"
Peter Agre – chemist, Nobel Prize in Chemistry, 2003
Oscar Zariski – Russian-born American mathematician
Fouad Ajami – Professor of Middle Eastern studies at SAIS and Director of the Council on Foreign Relations
William Foxwell Albright – authenticator of the Dead Sea Scrolls, linguist, ceramics expert
Ethan Allen Andrews – biologist
Christian B. Anfinsen – Nobel Prize in Chemistry, 1972
John Astin – television actor (The Addams Family), lecturer in the Johns Hopkins Writing Seminars department
James Mark Baldwin – philosopher
Gabrielle M. Spiegel – historian of the Middle Ages; former President of the American Historical Association 
John W. Baldwin – medievalist, member of the French Academy
Florence E. Bamberger – professor of education, director of the College for Teachers
John Barth – novelist
Charles L. Bennett – astrophysicist, Principal Investigator of the Wilkinson Microwave Anisotropy Probe (WMAP)
Peter Bergen – CNN terrorism analyst and author of Holy War, Inc.
Richard Bett – philosopher, former Executive Director of APA
Karin J. Blakemore – medical geneticist
Husain Haqqani – author, former Ambassador of Pakistan to the United States
Alfred Blalock – Lasker Prize–winning surgeon
Robert Branner – professor of art history (1969-1971)
Eric Brill – computer scientist
Max Broedel – medical illustrator and founder of the first US medical illustration graduate program
Amanda M. Brown – immunologist, professor of neurology and neuroscience
Harold Brown – Secretary of Defense, 1977–1981
Zbigniew Brzezinski – National Security Advisor, 1977–1981
Nicholas Murray Butler – Nobel Peace Prize, 1931
David P. Calleo – Director of European Studies, author of Rethinking Europe's Future
Benjamin Carson – former Director of Pediatric Neurosurgery at Johns Hopkins Hospital, author of Gifted Hands
Arthur Cayley – mathematician
William G. Cochran – statistician
J.M. Coetzee – Nobel Prize in Literature, 2003
Shirin R. Tahir-Kheli – political scientist; first U.S. Ambassador for Women's Empowerment; former Senior Advisor to the Secretary of State on United Nations Reform; former Senior Director for Democracy, Human Rights and International Operations at the White House National Security Council
Eliot A. Cohen – Director of Strategic Studies at SAIS, Advisor to the U.S. Secretary of Defense
Jared Cohon – President of Carnegie Mellon University, former Assistant and Associate Dean of Engineering at Johns Hopkins
William E. Connolly – influential political theorist
Thomas M. Cooley – appointed 1877, Michigan Supreme Court Justice, 1864–1885, namesake of Thomas M. Cooley Law School, also a Dean of University of Michigan Law School
W. Max Corden – trade economist, developed Dutch disease model
Robert J. Cotter – chemist and mass spectrometrist
Richard Threlkeld Cox – physicist, Cox's theorem
Thomas Craig – mathematician
Tyler Cymet – physician
Maqbool Dada – professor of operations management
Tinglong Dai – professor of operations management and business analytics
Veena Das – feminist anthropologist
Steven R. David – international relations
George Delahunty – Physiologist, endocrinologist, and Lilian Welsh Professor of Biology at Goucher College
Flavio Delbono – economist, mayor of Bologna
Samuel Denmeade – Professor of Oncology, Urology and Pharmacology and Molecular Sciences at the School of Medicine
Jacques Derrida – philosopher
Daniel Deudney – international relations
Stephen Dixon – prolific short story writer
David A. Dodge – former Governor, Bank of Canada; Co-Chairman, the Global Market Monitoring Group of Institute of International Finance; Chairman, C.D. Howe Institute; Chairman, Canadian Institute for Advanced Research; former Associate Professor of Canadian Studies and International Economics at the School of Advanced International Studies at Johns Hopkins University
Thomas Dolby – musician, film score composer, and music technology entrepreneur
Vincent du Vigneaud – Nobel Prize in Chemistry, 1955
Acheson J. Duncan – statistician, winner of the Shewhart Medal
Ward Edwards – psychologist, prominent for work on decision theory and on the formulation and revision of beliefs.
Jessica Einhorn – former dean of SAIS, managing director of the World Bank
Paul H. Emmett – chemical engineer, Manhattan Project
George L. Engel – psychiatrist, best known for the formulation of the biopsychosocial model
Joseph Erlanger – Nobel Prize in Medicine, 1944
Maria Teresa Landi  – epidemiologist and oncologist
Andrew Fire – Nobel Prize in Medicine, 2006
Marisa Lino – former U.S. Ambassador to Albania and former director of the Bologna Center of the Paul H. Nitze School of Advanced International Studies 
Henry Jones Ford – political scientist and journalist
P. M. Forni – literary scholar and co-founder of the Johns Hopkins Civility Project
James Franck – Nobel Prize in Physics, 1925
John K. Frost – cytopathologist, founder and director of the Division of Cytopathology at Hopkins
Francis Fukuyama – political economist, author The End of History
Donald Geman – statistician
Ashraf Ghani – President of Afghanistan, 2014–present
Riccardo Giacconi – Nobel Prize in Physics, 2002; National Medal of Science, 2003
Robert Stephen Ford – retired diplomat; former U.S. Ambassador to Algeria and Syria
Basil Lanneau Gildersleeve – classical scholar
Benjamin Ginsberg – Libertarian political scientist and professor
Maria Goeppert-Mayer – Nobel Prize in Physics, 1963
Michael Griffin – former NASA Administrator (2005–2009)
Stanislav Grof – psychologist
G. Stanley Hall – pioneer in the field of psychology; founding president of Clark University
William Stewart Halsted – founding head of the Department of Surgery
Steve H. Hanke – economist, United States Presidential advisor, Cato Institute senior fellow
Haldan Keffer Hartline – Nobel Prize in Medicine, 1967
David Harvey (until 2001) – geographer
Robert Heptinstall – Renal pathologist, chair of the Hopkins pathology department
Robert Herman – founding father of the field of transportation science
Christian A. Herter, Jr. – former U.S. Secretary of State and Governor of Massachusetts
John L. Holland – psychologist who developed the RIASEC career model
Roger Horn – co-developed the Bateman-Horn conjecture and wrote the standard-issue Matrix Analysis textbook with Charles Royal Johnson
Hans-Hermann Hoppe – economist
Ralph H. Hruban – pathologist
David H. Hubel – Nobel Prize in Medicine, 1971
Kathy Hudson –  microbiologist specializing in science policy. Founder of the Genetics and Public Policy Center at Johns Hopkins University
Touqir Hussain – former Ambassador of Pakistan to Brazil, Spain, and Japan, former Diplomatic Adviser to the Prime Minister of Pakistan
Rufus Isaacs – game theorist, winner of Frederick W. Lanchester Prize
Nathan Jacobson – mathematician
Kay Redfield Jamison – Professor of Psychiatry
Frederick Jelinek – pioneer in automatic speech recognition and natural language processing
Ellis L. Johnson – Professor Emeritus and the Coca-Cola Chaired Professor in the H. Milton Stewart School of Industrial and Systems Engineering at Georgia Institute of Technology
Kenneth H. Keller – President of the University of Minnesota system
Howard Atwood Kelly – founding head of the Department of Gynecology
Hugh Kenner – Andrew Mellon professor of humanities 1973–1990, literary critic, expert on Ezra Pound and James Joyce, and popular writer on computing
Majid Khadduri – Professor of Islamic Law and Middle East specialist
Kunihiko Kodaira – mathematician, Fields Medal winner
Anne O. Krueger – Managing Director of the IMF and World Bank Chief Economist
Simon Kuznets – Nobel Prize in Economics, 1971
Barbara Landau – cognitive scientist, leading authority on Williams syndrome
Sidney Lanier
Albert L. Lehninger – author of a long-time standard biochemistry textbook
Robert C. Lieberman – political scientist
Paul Linebarger – author known as Cordwainer Smith
Alfred J. Lotka – mathematician and statistician
Arthur Oncken Lovejoy – philosopher, founder of the Journal of the History of Ideas
Marty Makary – physician
Nina Marković – physicist and professor
Elmer McCollum – professor and biochemist, co-discovered vitamins A, B, and D
Alice McDermott – novelist, National Book Award, 1998
Victor A. McKusick – medical geneticist, author of Mendelian Inheritance in Man
Andrew Mertha – political scientist 
Merton H. Miller – Nobel Prize in Economics, 1990
George Richards Minot – Nobel Prize in Medicine, 1934
Jack Morava – mathematician
Frank Morley – mathematician
Harmon Northrop Morse – chemist, Avogadro Medal 1916
Robert H. Mundell – Nobel Prize in Economics, 1999
Azar Nafisi – Muslim feminist and author
Daniel Nathans – Nobel Prize in Medicine, 1978
Simon Newcomb – astronomer and mathematician
John Niparko – surgeon and scientist specializing in cochlear implants
Paul H. Nitze – diplomat, principal author NSC 68, co-founder of SAIS
Santa J. Ono – 15th President & Vice-Chancellor, University of British Columbia; 28th President, University of Cincinnati; Immunologist
Lars Onsager – Nobel Prize in Chemistry, 1968
Sir William Osler – founding head of the Department of Medicine
Sidney Painter – medievalist
Edwards A. Park—Chief-of-Pediatrics in the Harriet Lane Home, proofed the cause of rickets
Robert G. Parr – theoretical chemist
Henry Paulson – former U.S. Treasury Secretary (2006–2009)
Ronald Paulson – English specialist
Charles Sanders Peirce – logician
Phillip Phan – Alonzo and Virginia Decker Professor of Strategy and Entrepreneurship
J.G.A. Pocock – Harry C. Black Professor of History Emeritus
John Pollini – art historian
Matthew Porterfield – Film Director and Professor of Film
Ayn Rand – author of The Fountainhead and Atlas Shrugged; visiting lecturer in 1961
Mark M. Ravitch – surgeon
Stuart C. Ray – HIV researcher
Ira Remsen – chemist, discoverer of saccharin
Francisco Rico Manrique – visiting professor of Spanish, 1966–1967
Riordan Roett – political scientist and Latin America specialist
Richard S. Ross – cardiologist; former dean of Johns Hopkins School of Medicine
Henry Augustus Rowland – physicist
Avi Rubin – head of the ACCURATE organization, established to solve the problem of secure electronic voting
Pedro Salinas – Spanish poet, Turnbull Professor
Mavis Sanders – faculty and researcher at Center for Research on the Education of Students Placed at Risk, director of Urban Education program, assistant director of the National Network of Partnership Schools
Karl Shapiro – professor of poetry, former U.S. Poet Laureate 
Vyacheslav Shokurov – mathematician
Charles S. Singleton – scholar of medieval Italian literature
Robert Skidelsky – economist, biographer of John Maynard Keynes
Hamilton O. Smith – Nobel Prize in Medicine, 1978
R. Jeffrey Smith – Pulitzer Prize winner
Paul Smolensky – cognitive scientist; authored Optimality Theory
Solomon H. Snyder – National Medal of Science, 2003
Leo Spitzer – romance philologist, literary scholar
Julian Stanley – Professor of Psychology; founder of the Study of Mathematically Precocious Youth
Sir Richard Stone – Nobel Prize in Economics, 1984
Mark Strand – 1990–1991 US Poet Laureate, Pulitzer Prize winner
Raman Sundrum – physicist
Kathleen M. Sutcliffe – Bloomberg Distinguished Professor of Business and Medicine
James Joseph Sylvester – mathematician
Caroline Bedell Thomas – cardiologist, Johns Hopkins School of Medicine third female full professor
Vivien Thomas – co-developer of the Blalock-Thomas-Taussig shunt, along with Alfred Blalock and Helen Taussig.
Clifford Truesdell – mathematician, natural philosopher, historian of mathematics
Harold Clayton Urey – Nobel Prize in Chemistry, 1934
Henry N. Wagner – pioneer in nuclear medicine 
Kameshwar C. Wali – physicist, member of Johns Hopkins Society of Scholars from 1980
John Walker – concert organist (Peabody Conservatory)
Bruce W. Wardropper – Hispanist, Spanish refugee, scholar of Spanish drama
David B. Weishampel – paleontologist, author of The Dinosauria 2004
William H. Welch – founding head of the Department of Pathology
James West – National Medal of Technology, 2006
George Hoyt Whipple – Nobel Prize in Medicine, 1934
Chester Wickwire – Chaplain emeritus and humanist
Torsten Wiesel – Nobel Prize in Medicine, 1981
Michael Williams – philosopher
Denis Wirtz – Vice Provost for Research and Theophilus Halley Smoot Professor of Engineering Science
Paul Wolfowitz – President, World Bank, former United States Deputy Secretary of Defense, former Dean of SAIS
Barry Wood – microbiologist and physician
Robert W. Wood – experimental physicist
Elias Zerhouni – Director of the National Institutes of Health

Fictional alumni

Dr. Ellie Bartlet – daughter of President Josiah Bartlet in the television series The West Wing
Dr. Preston Burke – cardiothoracic surgeon on the television series Grey's Anatomy
Dr. Tom Koracick – neurosurgeon on the television series Grey's Anatomy
Dr. Arizona Robbins - pediatric surgeon on the television series Grey's Anatomy
Dr. Amelia Shepherd - neurosurgeon on television series Grey's Anatomy
Dr. Perry Cox – main character of the television series Scrubs
Dr. James Harvey – paranormal therapist portrayed by Bill Pullman in Casper (film)
Dr. Julius Hibbert – family doctor on The Simpsons
Dr. Gregory House – main character of the television series House
Lena – professor and biologist portrayed by Natalie Portman in Annihilation, based on the novel by Jeff VanderMeer
Dr. Hannibal Lecter – psychiatrist and cannibalistic serial killer in The Silence of the Lambs, based on the novel by Thomas Harris
Dr. Steven Newsome – doctor played by Edward Herrmann in M*A*S*H episode "Heal Thyself" (Season 8, Episode 17)
Dr. John Prentice – doctor played by Sidney Poitier in Guess Who's Coming to Dinner
Dr. Zoe Hart – big city surgical resident turned rural Alabama general practitioner played by Rachel Bilson in Hart of Dixie

References 

Johns Hopkins University